Byron usually refers to the English poet and writer George Gordon Byron, 6th Baron Byron (1788–1824), commonly known as Lord Byron.

Byron may also refer to:

People and fictional characters
 Byron (name), including lists of people and fictional characters with the surname or given name

Places

United States
 Byron, California, a census-designated place
 Byron, Georgia, a city
 Byron, Illinois, a city
 Byron Nuclear Generating Station
 Byron, LaPorte County, Indiana
 Byron, Parke County, Indiana
 Byron, Maine, a town
 Byron, Michigan, a village
 Byron, Nevada, a ghost town
 Byron, Minnesota, a city
 Byron, Missouri, an unincorporated community
 Byron, Nebraska, a village
 Byron, New York, a town
 Byron, Ohio, an unincorporated community
 Byron, Oklahoma, a town
 Byron Township (disambiguation) 
 Lake Byron (South Dakota)
 Byron, Fond du Lac County, Wisconsin, a town
 Byron (community), Fond du Lac County, Wisconsin, an unincorporated community within the town
 Byron Hill (railroad location), a hill between the town and the city of Fond du Lac
 Byron, Monroe County, Wisconsin, a town
 Byron, Wyoming, a town

Australia
 Byron Bay, a coastal town in north-east New South Wales
 Byron Shire, a local government area in New South Wales
 Cape Byron, easternmost point on mainland Australia
 Electoral district of Byron, from 1913 to 1927

Outer space
 Byron (crater), on Mercury
 3306 Byron, a main-belt asteroid

Elsewhere
 Byron Sound, Falkland Islands
 Byron, Ontario, Canada, a neighbourhood of the city of London
 Byron Point, on the north shore of Drury Inlet on the Central Coast of British Columbia, Canada

Ships
 Byron, a schooner built about 1849 and sunk in Lake Michigan in 1867 - see Byron shipwreck
 , an ocean liner built in 1914 as Vasilefs Constantinos, renamed Byron in 1924 and scrapped in 1937
 , a frigate built in 1943 and scrapped in 1947

Arts and entertainment
 Byron (play), a 1908 play by British writer Alicia Ramsey about Lord Byron
 Byron (TV film), a 2003 BBC production based on Lord Byron's life
 Byron (band), a Romanian alternative/progressive rock band

Other uses
 Baron Byron, a title in the Peerage of England
 Byron High School (disambiguation)
 Byron Company, a New York City photography studio founded in 1892
 Byron Gallery, a New York City art gallery from 1961 to 1971
 Byron Hamburgers, a chain of hamburger restaurants in the United Kingdom

See also
 Port Byron (disambiguation)
 Biram (disambiguation)
 Biron (disambiguation)